The Crisis States Research Centre or 'Crisis States' was based within the Development Studies Institute (DESTIN, now Department of International Development) of the London School of Economics.  It was a broad research initiative funded by a grant from the UK Department for International Development (DFID) from 2000-2010. Its research concerned the origins and management of political conflict in the Global South. The Centre produced a number of articles, chapters, policy briefings, and other communications dealing with the origins, political economy, and mitigation of conflictual governance and violence. Particular emphasis was placed on events in Nicaragua, Uganda, Venezuela, the DRC, Colombia and the Philippines.

The Centre ran through two phases, the first from 2000-2005, led by Prof. James Putzel. There was collaboration around the world and, at LSE, some of the core participants were Teddy Brett, Tim Allen, David Keen, Jonathan DiJohn, Dennis Rodgers and Jean-Paul Faguet. Funding was not renewed after the second phase.

The most cited output from the project is a summary report from 2012.

See also
Fragile state
Failed state

References

 Putzel, J. War, State Collapse and Reconstruction: Phase 2 of the Crisis States Programme, Crisis States Research Centre, Working Paper 1, September 2005

External links
 Crisis States Research Centre website (defunct)
 London School of Economics and Political Science
 Department for International Development

London School of Economics